Bornemisza or Bornemisza de Kászon et Impérfalva is the name of the Hungarian noble family which dates back to 17th century. In 1905 Heinrich Thyssen, member of the German Thyssen family, married Baroness Margit (1887-1971), the daughter of the king's Hungarian chamberlain Baron Gábor Bornemisza de Kászon et Impérfalva (1859-1915). Gabor, being the last male of his line and having no sons of his own, adopted Heinrich, his son in law. As a result of the adoption, the Emperor Franz Joseph I of Austria-Hungary officially extended his father-in-law's baronial title in the Hungarian nobility to Heinrich and his male-line descendants in 1907. Since then, their legitimate male line offspring bear the name von Thyssen-Bornemisza de Kászon et Impérfalva.

Notable members
Hans Heinrich Thyssen-Bornemisza
Fiona Thyssen-Bornemisza
Heinrich, Baron Thyssen-Bornemisza de Kászon
Péter Bornemisza
Anna Bornemisza
George Bornemissza
Francesca Anne Dolores Freiin Thyssen-Bornemisza de Kászon et Impérfalva
Gergely Bornemissza

See also
List of titled noble families in the Kingdom of Hungary

Hungarian-language surnames